Genu recurvatum is a deformity in the knee joint, so that the knee bends backwards. In this deformity, excessive extension occurs in the tibiofemoral joint. Genu recurvatum is also called knee hyperextension and back knee. This deformity is more common in women and people with familial ligamentous laxity. Hyperextension of the knee may be mild, moderate or severe.

The normal range of motion (ROM) of the knee joint is from 0 to 135 degrees in an adult. Full knee extension should be no more than 10 degrees. In genu recurvatum, normal extension is increased. The development of genu recurvatum may lead to knee pain and knee osteoarthritis.

Causes

The following factors may be involved in causing this deformity:
 Inherent laxity of the knee ligaments
 Weakness of biceps femoris muscle
 Instability of the knee joint due to ligaments and joint capsule injuries
 Inappropriate alignment of the tibia and femur
 Malunion of the bones around the knee
 Weakness in the hip extensor muscles
 Gastrocnemius muscle weakness (in standing position)
 Upper motor neuron lesion (for example, hemiplegia as the result of a cerebrovascular accident)
 Lower motor neuron lesion (for example, in post-polio syndrome)
 Deficit in joint proprioception
 Lower limb length discrepancy
 Congenital genu recurvatum
 Cerebral palsy
 Muscular dystrophy
 Limited dorsiflexion (plantar flexion contracture)
 Popliteus muscle weakness
 Connective tissue disorders. In these disorders, there are excessive joint mobility (joint hypermobility) problems. These disorders include:
 Marfan syndrome
 Loeys–Dietz syndrome
 Ehlers–Danlos syndrome
 Benign hypermobile joint syndrome
 Osteogenesis imperfecta disease

Pathophysiology
The most important factors of knee stability include:
 Ligaments of the knee: The knee joint is stabilized by four main ligaments:
 Anterior cruciate ligament (ACL). The ACL has an important role in stabilization of knee extension movement by preventing the knee from hyperextending.
 Posterior cruciate ligament (PCL)
 Medial collateral ligament (MCL)
 Lateral collateral ligament (LCL)
 Joint capsule or articular capsule (especially posterior knee capsule)
 Quadriceps femoris muscle
 Appropriate alignment of the femur and tibia (especially in knee extension position )

Treatment
Treatment generally includes the following:
 Sometimes pharmacologic therapy for initial disease treatment
 Physical therapy: physiotherapy will be beneficial in patient with complaint of pain, discomfort.
 Occupational therapy
 Use of appropriate assistive devices such as orthoses
 Surgery

Incidence
This condition is considered to be rare, with about 1 in 100,000 births being affected by the congenital form of genu recurvatum, although it's a common feature in some disorders, such as in joint hypermobility, which affects 1 in 30 people.

See also
 Genu varum
 Genu valgum
 Hypermobility

References

External links 
 The American Academy of Orthotists and Prosthetists
 The differential diagnosis of children with joint hypermobility: a review of the literature
 The American Academy of Orthotists and Prosthetists

Musculoskeletal disorders
Rheumatology
Orthopedic problems
Knee injuries and disorders
Rare diseases